Joshua Bradley-Hurst (born 10 January 2002) is a Sri Lankan footballer who plays as a goalkeeper for Clyde.

Career

Club career

Bradley-Hurst started his career with English second tier side Birmingham City. In 2019, he was sent on loan to Hungerford Town in the English sixth tier. Before the second half of 2020–21, Bradley-Hurst signed for Scottish third tier club Dumbarton.

In 2022, he was sent on loan to Clydebank in the Scottish sixth tier.

International career

Bradley-Hurst is eligible to represent Scotland internationally through his parents.

References

External links
 

2002 births
Association football goalkeepers
Birmingham City F.C. players
Clyde F.C. players
Clydebank F.C. players
Dumbarton F.C. players
Gloucester City A.F.C. players
Hungerford Town F.C. players
Living people
National League (English football) players
Sri Lankan expatriate footballers
Sri Lankan footballers
Sri Lankan people of Scottish descent